Pumphrey may refer to:

 Pumphrey, Maryland, a small town in Anne Arundel County in the United States
 Pumphrey, Texas, a small town in Runnels County in the United States

People
 Craig Pumphrey (born 1974), American presenter of Human Wrecking Balls with brother Paul Pumphrey
 Donnel Pumphrey (born 1994), American football player
 James W. Pumphrey (1832–1906), American livery stable owner who played a minor role in the assassination of Abraham Lincoln
 Jim Pumphrey (born 1941), former Australian rules footballer
 Laurence Pumphrey (1916–2009), British diplomat
 Paul Pumphrey, American presenter of Human Wrecking Balls with brother Craig Pumphrey
 William Pumphrey (1817–1905), English Quaker photographer

Fictional characters
 Adelfa Pumphrey, character in The King of Torts, a novel written by John Grisham
 Humphrey Pumphrey, character in the television series George and Mildred
 Joseph Pumphrey, character the 1922 American novel Babbitt written by Sinclair Lewis
 Mrs. Pumphrey, character in books by James Herriot adapted as All Creatures Great and Small

See also
 Pomfret (disambiguation)
 Pontefract
 Pontefract Castle